Aishwarya (Devanagari : ऐश्वर्य) is a Hindu Indian or Nepalese male or feminine given name, which means "prosperity" and "wealth".

Notable people named Aishwarya 
 Aishwariyaa Bhaskaran (born 1971), Indian actress
 Aishwarya Arjun (born 1990), Indian actress
 Aishwarya Devan (born 1993), Indian actress
 Aishwarya Dhanush (born 1982), Indian film director and classical dancer
 Aishwarya Lekshmi (born 1990), Indian actress, model
 Aishwarya Majmudar (born 1993), Indian singer
 Aishwarya Nedunchezhiyan (born 1996), Indian sailor
 Aishwarya of Nepal (1949–2001), Queen of Nepal from 1972 to 2001
 Aishwarya Nigam (born 1989), Indian singer
 Aishwarya Rai Bachchan (born 1973), Indian actress, model and winner of the 1994 Miss World pageant
 Aishwarya Rajesh (born 1990), Indian actress
 Aishwarya Rao (born 1994), Indian bowling player
 Aishwarya Sakhuja (born 1987), Indian actress and former model
 Aishwarya Vidhya Raghunath (born 1991), Indian vocalist

Notable people named Ashvarya 
 Ashvarya Shrivastava (born 1992), Indian professional tennis player

References 

Hindu given names
Indian feminine given names
Nepalese given names
Nepalese feminine given names